Dr. János Bácskai (born 5 February 1962) is a Hungarian politician, member of the National Assembly (MP) for Ferencváros (Budapest Constituency XII) between 2009 and 2014. He became MP after a by-election in 2009, following the resignation of Ferenc Gegesy (SZDSZ). Bácskai worked as a member of the Committee on Sustainable Development from 14 May 2010.

He became Mayor of Ferencváros in 2010, replacing Ferenc Gegesy who served as mayor of the 9th District since 1990. Bácskai defended his mayoral seat against Gegesy in October 2014. He was defeated by independent candidate Krisztina Baranyi during the 2019 local elections.

Personal life
He is married and has two children.

References

1962 births
Living people
Fidesz politicians
Members of the National Assembly of Hungary (2006–2010)
Members of the National Assembly of Hungary (2010–2014)
Politicians from Budapest